The 2021–22 season was the 132nd season in the existence of Servette FC and the club's third consecutive season in the top flight of Swiss football. In addition to the domestic league, Servette participated in this season's editions of the Swiss Cup and the UEFA Europa Conference League.

Players

First-team squad

Out on loan

Transfers

Pre-season and friendlies

Competitions

Overall record

Swiss Super League

League table

Results summary

Results by round

Matches
The league fixtures were announced on 24 June 2021.

Swiss Cup

UEFA Europa Conference League

Second qualifying round
The draw for the second qualifying round was held on 16 June 2021, 13:30 CEST.

References

Servette FC seasons
Servette
2021–22 UEFA Europa Conference League participants seasons